Geobenazzia is a genus of land planarians that currently contains a single species, Geobenazzia tyrrhenica, found in Elba, Italy.

Description 
The anatomy of Geobenazzia tyrrhenica is very similar to that of Othelosoma species, the main difference being the presence of an adenodactyl, a finger-like glandular projection, in the copulatory apparatus. The male copulatory apparatus has a large seminal vesicle and a penis papilla, while the female organ has a seminal bursa (or bursa copulatrix) connected to the vagina by one duct. There is also a duct connecting the female genital atrium to the intestine.

References 

Geoplanidae
Rhabditophora genera